State Highway 188 is a state highway in Andhra Pradesh, India. It passes through Chittoor, Yadamari, Gudiyatham, and Pernambut, connecting the Chittoor district.

See also
 List of State Highways in Andhra Pradesh

References

State Highways in Andhra Pradesh
Roads in Chittoor district